William and the Masked Ranger is a book of short stories in the Just William series by Richmal Crompton. It was first published in 1966.

The Stories
William and the Masked Ranger
William's Summer Holiday
William and the Donkey
Douglas's Great Experience
William and the Art Club
The Play's the Thing

1966 short story collections
Just William
Short story collections by Richmal Crompton
Children's short story collections
1966 children's books
George Newnes Ltd books